Schönbrunn is a municipality in the Rhein-Neckar district, Baden-Württemberg, Germany. It consists of the villages Allemühl, Haag, Moosbrunn, Schönbrunn and Schwanheim. It is situated in the southern part of the Odenwald hills, south of the river Neckar. Schönbrunn lies about 7 km southwest of Eberbach and 18 km east of Heidelberg.

Transport
The nearest train stations are in Hirschhorn and Eberbach, on the Neckar Valley Railway. Buses of the Verkehrsverbund Rhein-Neckar connect Schönbrunn with Eberbach, Mosbach and Heidelberg.

References

External links
 

Rhein-Neckar-Kreis
Populated places on the Neckar basin
Populated riverside places in Germany